Histone-binding protein RBBP4 (also known as RbAp48, or NURF55) is a protein that in humans is encoded by the RBBP4 gene.

Function 

This gene encodes a ubiquitously expressed nuclear protein that belongs to a highly conserved subfamily of WD-repeat proteins. It is present in protein complexes involved in histone acetylation and chromatin assembly. It is part of the Mi-2/NuRD complex that has been implicated in chromatin remodeling and transcriptional repression associated with histone deacetylation. This encoded protein is also part of corepressor complexes, which is an integral component of transcriptional silencing. It is found among several cellular proteins that bind directly to retinoblastoma protein to regulate cell proliferation. This protein also seems to be involved in transcriptional repression of E2F-responsive genes.

Clinical significance 

A decrease of RbAp48 in the dentate gyrus (DG) of the hippocampus in the brain is suspected to be a main cause of memory loss in normal aging.  An age related decrease in RbAp48 is observed in the DG from human post-mortem tissue and also in mice.  Furthermore, a gene knockin of a dominant negative form of RbAp48 of causes memory deficits in young mice similar to that observed in older mice. Finally lentiviral gene transfer to increase the expression of RbAp48 in the brain reverses memory deficits in older mice.

RBBP4 works at least in part through the PKA-CREB1-CPB pathway. Hence one possible therapeutic approach to restore age-related memory loss is the use of PKA-CREB1-CPB pathway stimulating drugs. It has previously been shown that dopamine D1/D5 agonists such as 6-Br-APB and SKF-38,393 that are positively coupled to adenylyl cyclase and the cAMP phosphodieserase inhibitor rolipram reduce memory defects in aged mice.

Interactions
RBBP4 has been shown to interact with:
 BRCA1, 
 CREBBP, 
 GATAD2B, 
 HDAC1, 
 HDAC2, 
 HDAC3,
 MTA2, 
 RB, 
 SAP30,  and
 SIN3A.

References

Further reading